Irish PEN Award for Literature is an annual literary award presented by Irish PEN since 1999. Its intent is to honour an Irish-born writer who has made an outstanding contribution to Irish literature. The award is for a significant body of work and is open to novelists, playwrights, poets, and scriptwriters.

In 2012, the award was presented to novelist Joseph O'Connor by the President of Ireland, Michael D. Higgins.

The award is one of many PEN awards sponsored by PEN affiliates in over 145 PEN centres around the world.

Recipients
 1999: John B. Keane
 2000: Brian Friel
 2001: Edna O'Brien
 2002: William Trevor
 2003: John McGahern
 2004: Neil Jordan
 2005: Seamus Heaney
 2006: Jennifer Johnston
 2007: Maeve Binchy
 2008: Thomas Kilroy
 2009: Roddy Doyle
 2010: Brendan Kennelly
 2011: Colm Tóibín 
 2012: Joseph O'Connor
 2013: John Banville
2014: Frank McGuinness
 2015: Éilís Ní Dhuibhne
 2017:  Anne Enright

 2018: Catherine Dunne
 2019: Eavan Boland

References

External links
 Irish PEN Award for Literature, official website

1999 establishments in Ireland
Awards established in 1999
International PEN literary awards
Literary awards honoring lifetime achievement
Irish literary awards